Ladies at Play is a lost 1926 American silent comedy film directed by Alfred E. Green and starring Doris Kenyon, Lloyd Hughes and Louise Fazenda.

It was remade as a sound film Loose Ankles in 1930.

Cast
 Doris Kenyon as Ann Harper  
 Lloyd Hughes as Gil Barry  
 Louise Fazenda as Aunt Katherine  
 Ethel Wales as Aunt Sarah  
 Hallam Cooley as Terry  
 John Patrick as Andy  
 Virginia Lee Corbin as Dotty  
 Philo McCullough as Hotel Clerk  
 Tom Ricketts as Deacon Ezra Boody

References

Bibliography
 Monaco, James. The Encyclopedia of Film. Perigee Books, 1991.

External links

1926 films
1926 comedy films
Silent American comedy films
Lost American films
Films directed by Alfred E. Green
American silent feature films
1920s English-language films
First National Pictures films
American black-and-white films
1926 lost films
Lost comedy films
1920s American films